The 1842 New York gubernatorial election was held on November 8, 1842 to elect the Governor and Lieutenant Governor of New York.

Background
This was the first gubernatorial election in New York which was held on a single day. Until 1841, the State elections had been held during three days beginning on the first Monday in November. In 1842, the State Legislature fixed the election day permanently on the Tuesday next after the first Monday in November.

Candidates

The Democratic Party nominated former Erie Canal Commissioner William C. Bouck. They nominated former state senator Daniel S. Dickinson for Lieutenant Governor.

The Whig Party nominated Lieutenant Governor Luther Bradish. They nominated state senator Gabriel Furman for Lieutenant Governor.

The Liberty Party nominated Alvan Stewart. They nominated Charles O. Shepard for Lieutenant Governor.

Results
The Democratic ticket of Bouck and Dickinson was elected.

Sources
Result: The Tribune Almanac 1843

1842
New York
Gubernatorial election
November 1842 events